Spofforth Castle in the village of Spofforth, North Yorkshire, England was a fortified manor house, ruined during the English Civil War and now run by English Heritage as a tourist attraction.

History

Spofforth Castle was built by Henry de Percy in the early 14th century when he was given a licence to crenellate a manor house on the site, with later alterations made in the 14th and 15th centuries. The hall-tower of the castle is all that remains of the ruins. The eastern wall of the hall was built largely upon rock foundations. The extant 13th-century structure consist of a ground-floor undercroft, which has a rock face forming its eastern wall due to its elevation. Two staircases remain on the eastern wall, cut into the rock which lead to the lobby area of the hall. There is a two-storey chamber section on the north side of the tower which has a polygonal stair turret to its northwest corner. The upper storey is of 15th-century construction, and is probably a restoration. 

The Percy estates, including Spofforth, were confiscated after the rebellion against King Henry IV in 1408 and given to Sir Thomas Rokeby. They were later restored and then lost again in 1461 when the Percys supported the losing side in the War of the Roses. Spofforth was eventually returned to the family and remained inhabited by their steward until 1604. The castle was reduced to ruins during the English Civil War of 1642–1646.

The castle was given to the Office of Works in 1924 by the 3rd Baron Leconfield. The ruins, primarily the west side of the original castle, are now listed as a grade II* listed building and under the guardianship of English Heritage as a tourist attraction. They are managed by Spofforth-with-Stockeld Parish Council.

See also
 Castles in Great Britain and Ireland
 List of castles in England

References

Bibliography

External links

 Visitor information at English Heritage
 

Castles in North Yorkshire
English Heritage sites in North Yorkshire
Grade II* listed buildings in North Yorkshire
Grade II* listed castles
Ruined castles in England
Ruins in North Yorkshire
Spofforth, North Yorkshire